Ee ja nai ka was a complex of carnivalesque religious celebrations and communal activities, often understood as social/political protests, which occurred in many parts of Japan in 1867–1868.

Eejanaika or Eijanaika may refer to:
 Eijanaika (film)
 Eejanaika (roller coaster)
 "Eijanaika" (song)